Good Springs is an unincorporated community in Rusk County, located in the U.S. state of Texas. According to the Handbook of Texas, the community had a population of 40 in 2000. It is located within the Longview, Texas metropolitan area.

History
Good Springs was named for a Cherokee village in the area. They were driven out of the area in 1839. It was also known as Lick Skillet for a time. Its population ranged from 25 in the 1940s, 21 in 1990, and 40 in 2000.

Geography

Education
Today, the community is served by the Carlisle Independent School District.

Notes

Unincorporated communities in Cherokee County, Texas
Unincorporated communities in Texas